Something About Love is a Canadian drama film, directed by Tom Berry and released in 1988. The film stars Stefan Wodoslawsky as Wally Olynyk, a man returning home to Cape Breton Island after several years living in the United States, to reunite with his estranged father Stan (Jan Rubeš) as the older man begins to suffer from dementia.

The film's cast also includes Jennifer Dale, Ron James, Lenore Zann, Don Lake, Wayne Robson and Susan Rubeš.

The film received two Genie Award nominations at the 10th Genie Awards in 1989, for Best Actor (Jan Rubeš) and Best Supporting Actor (James).

References

External links
 

1988 films
1988 drama films
Canadian drama films
English-language Canadian films
Films set in Nova Scotia
Films shot in Nova Scotia
1980s English-language films
1980s Canadian films